Sleepless Nights is the debut studio album by Japanese singer/songwriter Aimer. It was released on October 3, 2012 on Defstar Records in two versions: a limited CD+DVD edition and a regular CD-only edition.

Track listing

Awards and nominations

References

External links 
  (Aimer-web)
  (agehasprings)
  (Sony Music Entertainment Japan)
 Sleepless Nights on quia
 178 Sleepless Nights on Arata Kato Photography
 
 
 Sleepless Nights at VGMdb

2012 debut albums
Aimer albums
Japanese-language albums
Defstar Records albums